NFL GameDay 2003 is the eighth video game in the NFL GameDay series. It was developed by 989 Sports and published Sony Computer Entertainment America for the PlayStation and the PlayStation 2 in 2002. On the cover is Tom Brady.

Reception

The game received "mixed" reviews on both platforms according to the review aggregation website Metacritic.

References

External links
 

2002 video games
NFL GameDay video games
North America-exclusive video games
PlayStation (console) games
PlayStation 2 games
Video games developed in the United States
Video games set in 2003